Jacobus Storck (8 September 1641 – c.1700) was a Dutch Golden Age marine painter.

Biography
Storck was born and died in Amsterdam.  According to Houbraken he was the brother of the marine painter Abraham Storck who painted views of the Rhine and inland ships, but who was not as gifted.

According to the RKD he was the second son of the marine painter Johannes Sturckenburgh, younger brother of the marine painter Johannes Storck and older brother of Abraham. Signed works by him are dated 1664-1687. He sometimes signed JA Storck, which since 1963 has been interpreted as a work by both Jacobus and Abraham together.

References

Another view of the Lutheran church in the collection of the Amsterdam Museum
Jacobus Storck on Artnet

1641 births
1700s deaths
Painters from Amsterdam
Dutch Golden Age painters
Dutch male painters
Dutch marine artists